Șoimi is a commune in Bihor County, Crișana, Romania with a population of 2,543 people. It is composed of eight villages: Borz, Codru, Dumbrăvița de Codru (Havasdombró), Poclușa de Beiuș (Havaspoklos), Sânnicolau de Beiuș (Belényesszentmiklós), Șoimi, Ursad (Urszád) and Urviș de Beiuș (Belényesörvényes).

References

Communes in Bihor County
Localities in Crișana